Fionn is a masculine given name in Irish and Scottish Gaelic. In English, it is pronounced "Finn" or "Fee-on". It is derived from a byname meaning "white" or "fair-haired". It is the original version of a name later angliscist as Find and Finn. Notable people with the name include:

Fionn Carr, Irish rugby union player
Fionn Fitzgerald, Irish football player
Fionn MacColla, Scottish novelist
Fionn mac Cumhaill, figure from Irish mythology
Fionn McLoughlin, Irish rugby union player
Fionn O'Shea, Irish actor
Fionn Regan, Irish folk musician
Fionn Whitehead, English actor

See also
Fionn Bheinn, Scottish mountain

Irish-language masculine given names
Scottish Gaelic masculine given names